is a Prefectural Natural Park on the Tsugaru Peninsula in northwest Aomori Prefecture, Japan. Established in 1958, the park spans the borders of the municipalities of Goshogawara and Nakadomari. It encompasses  and Ashino Park, which is planted with 2,300 cherry trees.

See also
 National Parks of Japan

References

Parks and gardens in Aomori Prefecture
Goshogawara
Nakadomari, Aomori
Protected areas established in 1958
1958 establishments in Japan